Flight 46 or Flight 046 may refer to:

Downeast Flight 46, crashed on 30 May 1979
Austral Líneas Aéreas Flight 046, crashed on 12 June 1988

0046